Leucalburnus satunini, the mountain dace or White Kura bleak , is a species of cyprinid fish which is endemic to fast flowing mountain streams in a small high altitude plain in upper Kura drainage of eastern Turkey.  It is the only member of its genus.

References
 

Leuciscinae
Monotypic fish genera
Fish described in 1910